Remko Jurian Pasveer (born 8 November 1983) is a Dutch professional footballer who plays as a goalkeeper for Eredivisie club Ajax and the Netherlands national team.

Club career

Twente
Pasveer started playing football at local SC Enschede. He then moved to FC Twente, where he was reserve goalkeeper from 2003 to 2006, behind Cees Paauwe and Sander Boschker.

Heracles Almelo
In the summer of 2006 he left for Heracles Almelo, where he initially again had a role as backup goalkeeper, now behind Martin Pieckenhagen. In the 2008–09 and 2009–10 seasons, Pasveer was sent on loan to Go Ahead Eagles, who at the time played in the second-tier Eerste Divisie. After a difficult start, he grew into a fan favourite in Deventer. For the 2010–11 season, Pasveer returned to Heracles, this time to in the role as starting goalkeeper. He remained as starter for four years, after which he decided not to sign a contract extension.

PSV
In the summer of 2014, Pasveer signed a three-year contract with PSV, where he had to compete with first goalkeeper Jeroen Zoet. He made his official debut for the Eindhoven-based club on 21 August 2014, during the first of two legs against Belarusian club Shakhtyor Soligorsk in the final qualifying round for the 2014–15 UEFA Europa League. Pasveer played the entire match, which his club won 1–0 at home. He played several more times that season in both KNVB Cup and Europa League matches. A week after PSV secured the Eredivisie title, Pasveer also made his league debut for the club in matchday 32 against Excelsior. PSV triggered an option in his contract in May 2015 and thus committed him to the club until mid-2018. Pasveer won the national title with PSV for the second time in a row on 8 May 2016. The club started the last matchday of the season with as many points as rivals Ajax, but with a goal difference of –6. PSV then won 1–3 at PEC Zwolle that day, while Ajax drew 1–1 at De Graafschap. He did not make a league appearance that season, but only played in the cup tournament. Pasveer made his UEFA Champions League debut on 1 November 2016. Due to an injury from Zoet, he a made a start in the 1–2 lost group match at home against Bayern Munich. Pasveer made three league appearances during the 2016–17 season. Zoet, who was the starter that season, only conceded 23 goals in 31 appearances. With that, PSV had the statistically best defense in the Eredivisie that year, alongside the Ajax defense. The Eindhoven team finished third that season.

Vitesse
Pasveer signed with Vitesse in July 2017. He made his debut on 5 August 2017 during the lost game for the Johan Cruyff Shield against Feyenoord. His first year under head coach Leonid Slutsky was difficult, but eventually he grew into a starter and team captain. In the 2019–20 season, he was voted "Player of the Year" by Vitesse fans.

Ajax
On 23 April 2021, it was announced that Pasveer had signed a two-year contract with Ajax, joining the club on a free transfer from 1 July. He made his debut for the club on 7 August in a 4–0 loss to PSV in the Johan Cruyff Shield. Due to suspensions and injuries for goalkeepers André Onana and Maarten Stekelenburg, Pasveer stayed on as the starter in goal. On 19 October 2021 Pasveer earned a record as the first goalkeeper to stop three direct shots on goal from Norwegian striker Erling Haaland in a UEFA Champions League match. Pasveer went on to keep a clean sheet against Borussia Dortmund as the match ended a 4–0 win for Ajax. Four days later, Pasveer kept a clean-sheet once more, in a regular season match, as Ajax defeated his former club, and rivals PSV Eindhoven 5–0 at home. He conceded only 2 goals in the domestic league prior to matchday 12, played on 7 November 2021. This proved to be a record, as no goalkeeper in the Eredivisie had conceded so few goals during the first 12 games before. This yielded an impressive average of 1 goal against every 4 matches, both at national and international level.

International career
Pasveer was part of the Netherlands squad that won the 2006 UEFA European Under-21 Championship in Portugal.

On 22 September 2022, Pasveer made his debut for the Netherlands as a starter against Poland in a 2022–23 UEFA Nations League match. At age 38, he was the second oldest player to ever debut for the Dutch national team, after Sander Boschker in 2010 (aged 39).

Career statistics

Club

International

Honours
Heracles Almelo
KNVB Cup runner-up: 2011–12

PSV
Eredivisie: 2014–15, 2015–16
Johan Cruyff Shield: 2016, 2017

Ajax
Eredivisie: 2021–22

Netherlands U21
UEFA European Under-21 Championship: 2006

Individual
Vitesse Player of the Year: 2019–20

References

External links

Profile at the AFC Ajax website

1983 births
Living people
Footballers from Enschede
Dutch footballers
Association football goalkeepers
FC Twente players
Heracles Almelo players
Go Ahead Eagles players
PSV Eindhoven players
Jong PSV players
SBV Vitesse players
AFC Ajax players
Eredivisie players
Eerste Divisie players
Netherlands international footballers
2022 FIFA World Cup players